Yates is a English pub chain. It was founded as Yates's Wine Lodge in Oldham, Lancashire by Peter and Simon Yates in 1884.

History

Yates is Britain's oldest pub chain. Its motto was moderation is true temperance. The founders, brothers Peter and Simon Yates, were from Preston. Peter (who lived from April 22, 1854–1944) was sent to Spain to learn about wine. Simon went to the US to learn about business methods.

The first Yates Wine Lodge opened in Oldham in 1884.

Ownership

Public company
On July 23, 1994, Yates became a public company owned by the Yates Group PLC (Yates Brothers Wine Lodges PLC). The Yates Group also owned Ha! Ha! Bar & Canteen and operated pubs under the Blob Shop and Addison's name. In the late 1990s, its share price rose to reach a high of 550p in 1998.

In June 2001, the Yates Group entered takeover talks with Luminar Group. In July 2001, it withdrew from takeover talks and saying it would instead sell off 25 of its pubs, later putting 18 of them up for sale. On November 1, 2001, the Yates Group sold eight pubs to Morrells for £4 million, with four being in Grantham, Slough, Solihull and Tunbridge Wells.

In October 2003, Yates sold its Aussie White fortified brand to Halewood International for £1 million.

Management buyout
In June 2004, when 30 per cent of the company was owned by the Dickson and Yates family, the Yates Group had a management buyout offer (MBO) funded by GI Partners. At the time, the company was valued at £98.4 million (140p a share) and employed 4,000 people. While GI Partners only received 16 per cent of acceptances from shareholders (not the 90 per cent it was looking for), the bid proceeded in October 2004.

Takeover by Laurel Pub Company
By 2005, the Yates Group had grown to 125 Yates pubs and 25 Ha! Ha! bars. In April 2005, the company was approached by the Tchenguiz-owned Laurel Pub Company and a £200-million merger was completed on May 20, 2005. A few weeks later, Laurel bought many of the sites belonging to the bankrupt SFI Group PLC, who owned Slug and Lettuce.

Administration
On 27 March 2008, Laurel was put into administration.

Business
There are still more than 70 Yates pubs or bars in the UK, although there is no longer one in Oldham. The site of the original Yates Wine Lodge is now a McDonald's and is marked by a plaque on Oldham High Street. Some Yates have been converted to Slug and Lettuce pubs in recent years.

Yates Australian White continues to be made by Halewood International and is sold in 35-centilitre, 70-centilitre and 1.5-litre containers.

References

External links
 Official website (archived)
 

1884 establishments in the United Kingdom
Companies based in Luton
Companies based in Oldham
Restaurants established in 1884
Companies formerly listed on the London Stock Exchange
History of Oldham
Pub chains
Stonegate Pub Company